Beatles VI is the seventh Capitol Records studio album by the English rock band the Beatles in the United States and Canada (including The Beatles' Story). It was the ninth album released into that market in less than one and a half years (Vee-Jay Records and United Artists Records also released one album each during that period). The LP was released in both mono and stereo versions.

Beatles VI reached number one on the Billboard for six weeks, beginning on 10 July 1965.

This LP was also released in New Zealand in stereo in time for Christmas 1966. The pressing plates were obtained from EMI (UK) and are identical to their export-release. The title on the record label erroneously reads Beatles IV, and the catalogue number is PCSM 6042.
Beatles VI is available on CD as part of The Capitol Albums, Volume 2 box set in both stereo and mono mixes (catalogue number CDP 0946 3 57499 2 2.)  In 2014, Beatles VI was issued on CD again, individually and as part of The U.S. Albums boxed set.

Music
Beatles VI includes two tracks featuring searing John Lennon vocals, recorded specifically for the North American market: "Bad Boy" and "Dizzy Miss Lizzy", both covers of Larry Williams songs, and both recorded on Williams' birthday (10 May 1965), marking perhaps the only time that the Beatles recorded material especially for North America. "Dizzy Miss Lizzy" was part of the set of their 1965 US concerts and was soon included on the British release of the Help! album, but "Bad Boy" was not released in the United Kingdom or anywhere else in the world until 1966, when it appeared on the compilation A Collection of Beatles Oldies. These two songs, along with "Act Naturally" the following month, were the last cover songs recorded and released by the Beatles until "Maggie Mae" appeared on the Let It Be album in 1970.

Beatles VI also included:
 the remaining six tracks from Beatles for Sale (i.e., those left off Beatles '65, although 2 such songs had been released on a single in February 1965)
 "Yes It Is", the B-side to the single "Ticket to Ride". This is a "duophonic" stereo remix from the original mono track, with additional echo and reverb.
 two other tracks from the forthcoming UK release of Help!: "You Like Me Too Much" and "Tell Me What You See"

As on Beatles for Sale, the "Kansas City"/"Hey-Hey-Hey-Hey!" medley was originally listed only as "Kansas City". After attorneys for Venice Music notified Capitol of its error, the record label was soon corrected, although the album cover never was.

Track listing

Charts and certifications

In the U.S., the album sold 899,025 copies by 31 December 1965 and 1,094,707 copies by the end of the decade.

Chart performance

Certifications

Notes

References

External links

1965 albums
Albums produced by George Martin
The Beatles albums
Capitol Records albums